Dalkhola Municipality or DM was established in the year 2003 and has been responsible for the civic infrastructure and administration of the city of Dalkhola.

Geography

Dalkhola Municipality is located at

Councillors

Departments

References

Municipalities of West Bengal